Jonathan D. Barnett (born 1955) is a businessman and Republican politician from Siloam Springs, Arkansas, who served in the Arkansas House of Representatives from 2009 until he was term-limited in 2015. Barnett represented District 97 from 2009 to 2013, and served as the House Assistant Speaker Pro Tempore. Following redistricting, Barnett represented District 87 for his last term from 2013 to 2015. Barnett also served on the Arkansas State Highway Commission from 1999 to 2009. Barnett is the owner of Jonathan Barnett Enterprises, Inc., a general contracting and real estate company.

References

1955 births
Living people
Republican Party members of the Arkansas House of Representatives
People from Siloam Springs, Arkansas
2012 United States presidential electors
2016 United States presidential electors
Arkansas city council members
Baptists from Arkansas
Businesspeople from Arkansas
Members of the Arkansas State Highway Commission